George Washington Ewing (November 29, 1808 – May 20, 1888) was an American Confederate politician from Kentucky. He was a Confederate delegate then representative during the Civil War.

Ewing was born in Adairville, Kentucky, and educated in the common schools of Logan County. He studied law, and after passing the bar exam, he became an attorney.

He served in the state legislature as representative from Logan County from 1842 to 1844, and again from 1859 to 1863.

He went on to represent the state in the Provisional Confederate Congress, the First Confederate Congress, and the Second Confederate Congress from 1861 to 1865.

Ewing died near Adairville on May 20, 1888. He was buried in the old Red River Meeting House Cemetery in Logan County, Kentucky.

References

External links
 Political Graveyard
 Find a Grave

1808 births
1888 deaths
Deputies and delegates to the Provisional Congress of the Confederate States
Members of the Confederate House of Representatives from Kentucky
19th-century American politicians
People from Logan County, Kentucky
Kentucky lawyers
19th-century American lawyers